Cadbury, formerly Cadbury's and Cadbury Schweppes, is a British multinational confectionery company owned by Mondelez International (originally Kraft Foods) since 2010. It is the second largest confectionery brand in the world after Mars. Cadbury is internationally headquartered in Greater London, and operates in more than 50 countries worldwide. It is known for its Dairy Milk chocolate, the Creme Egg and Roses selection box, and many other confectionery products. One of the best-known British brands, in 2013 The Daily Telegraph named Cadbury among Britain's most successful exports.

Cadbury was founded in 1824, in Birmingham, England, by John Cadbury (1801–1889), a Quaker who sold tea, coffee and drinking chocolate. Cadbury developed the business with his brother Benjamin, followed by his sons Richard and George. George developed the Bournville estate, a model village designed to give the company's workers improved living conditions. Dairy Milk chocolate, introduced by George Jr in 1905, used a higher proportion of milk in the recipe than rival products. By 1914, it was the company's best-selling product. Successive members of the Cadbury family have made innovations with chocolate products. Cadbury, Rowntree's and Fry's, were the big three British confectionery manufacturers throughout much of the 19th and 20th centuries.

Cadbury was granted its first royal warrant from Queen Victoria in 1854. It held a royal warrant from Elizabeth II from 1955 to 2022. Cadbury merged with J. S. Fry & Sons in 1919, and Schweppes in 1969, known as Cadbury Schweppes until 2008, when the American beverage business was split as Dr Pepper Snapple Group; the rights ownership of the Schweppes brand had already differed between various countries since 2006. In 1992, chairman of the company for 24 years, Sir Adrian Cadbury, produced the Cadbury Report, a code of best practice which served as a basis for reform of corporate governance around the world. Cadbury was a constant constituent of the FTSE 100 on the London Stock Exchange from the index's 1984 inception until the company was bought by Kraft Foods Inc. in 2010.

History

1800–1900: Early history 

In 1824, John Cadbury, a Quaker, began selling tea, coffee and drinking chocolate in Bull Street in Birmingham, England. From 1831, he moved into the production of a variety of cocoa and drinking chocolates, made in a factory in Bridge Street and sold mainly to the wealthy because of the high cost of production. In 1847, John Cadbury became a partner with his brother Benjamin and the company became known as "Cadbury Brothers". In 1847, Cadbury's competitor Fry's of Bristol produced the first chocolate bar (which would be mass-produced as Fry's Chocolate Cream in 1866). Cadbury introduced his brand of the chocolate bar in 1849, and that same year, Cadbury and Fry's chocolate bars were displayed publicly at a trade fair in Bingley Hall, Birmingham. The Cadbury brothers opened an office in London, and, in 1854, they received the royal warrant as manufacturers of chocolate and cocoa to Queen Victoria. The company went into decline in the late 1850s.

John Cadbury's sons Richard and George took over the business in 1861. At the time of the takeover, the business was in rapid decline: the number of employees had reduced from 20 to 11, and the company was losing money. By 1866, Cadbury was profitable again. The brothers had turned around the business by moving the focus from tea and coffee to chocolate, and by increasing the quality of their products.

The firm's first major breakthrough occurred in 1866, when Richard and George introduced an improved cocoa into Britain. A new cocoa press developed in the Netherlands removed some of the unpalatable cocoa butter from the cocoa bean. The firm began exporting its products in the 1850s. In 1861, the company created Fancy Boxes (a decorated box of chocolates) and, in 1868, they were sold in boxes in the shape of a heart for Valentine's Day. Boxes of filled chocolates quickly became associated with the holiday.

Cadbury manufactured their first Easter egg in 1875, creating the modern chocolate Easter egg after developing a pure cocoa butter that could be moulded into smooth shapes. By 1893, Cadbury had 19 different varieties of chocolate Easter egg on sale.

In 1878, the brothers decided to build new premises in countryside  from Birmingham. The move to the countryside was unprecedented in business. Better transport access for milk that was shipped inward by canal, and cocoa that was brought in by rail from London, Southampton and Liverpool docks was taken into consideration. With the development of the Birmingham West Suburban Railway along the path of the Worcester and Birmingham Canal, they acquired the Bournbrook estate, comprising  of countryside south of Birmingham. Located next to the Stirchley Street railway station, which itself was opposite the canal, they renamed the estate Bournville and opened the Bournville factory in 1879. In 1891, the Cadbury brothers filed a patent for a chocolate-coated biscuit.

In 1893, George Cadbury bought  of land close to the works and planned, at his own expense, a model village which would 'alleviate the evils of modern more cramped living conditions'. As the Cadbury family were Quakers, there were no pubs in the estate.

In 1897, following the lead of Swiss companies, Cadbury introduced its own line of milk chocolate bars. In 1899 Cadbury became a private limited company.

1900–1969

In 1905, Cadbury launched its Dairy Milk bar, a high quality product with a greater proportion of milk than previous chocolate bars. Developed by George's son, George Cadbury Jr (along with his research and development team), it was the first time a British company had been able to mass-produce milk chocolate. From the beginning, it had the distinctive purple wrapper. It was a great sales success, and became the company's best selling product by 1914. The stronger Bournville Cocoa line was introduced in 1906. Cadbury Dairy Milk and Bournville Cocoa were to provide the basis for the company's rapid pre-war expansion. In 1910, Cadbury sales overtook those of Fry for the first time.

Cadbury's Milk Tray was first produced in 1915 and continued in production throughout the remainder of the First World War. More than 2,000 of Cadbury's male employees joined the British Armed Forces, and to support the British war effort, Cadbury provided chocolate, books and clothing to the troops. George Cadbury handed over two company-owned buildings for use as hospitals – "The Beeches" and "Fircroft", and the management of both hospitals earned the War Office's highest award. Factory girls, dubbed 'The Cadbury Angels', volunteered to do the laundry of injured soldiers recovering in the hospitals. After the war, the Bournville factory was redeveloped and mass production began in earnest. In 1918, Cadbury opened their first overseas factory in Hobart, Tasmania. A trainline was also built for easier access to Hobart. Of the 16 women who came to Tasmania to set up the factory, seven are known to have returned to the UK, two married and stayed in Tasmania, two did not marry but stayed and five left no record.

In 1919, Cadbury merged with J. S. Fry & Sons, another leading British chocolate manufacturer, resulting in the integration of well-known brands such as Fry's Chocolate Cream and Fry's Turkish Delight. In 1921, the many small Fry's factories around Bristol were closed down, and production was consolidated at a new Somerdale Factory, outside Bristol.

Cadbury expanded its product range with Flake (1920), Creme eggs (1923), Fruit and Nut (1928), and Crunchie (1929, originally under the Fry's label). By 1930, Cadbury was the 24th-largest British manufacturing company as measured by estimated market value of capital. Cadbury took direct control of the under-performing Fry in 1935. Dairy Milk Whole Nut arrived in 1933, and tins of Roses were introduced in 1938 (competing with Quality Street launched by Mackintosh's in 1936). Roses has become a very popular Christmas (and Mother's Day) gift.

By the mid-1930s, Cadbury estimated that 90 percent of the British population could readily afford to buy chocolate as it was no longer considered a luxury item for the working classes. By 1936, Dairy Milk accounted for 60 percent of the UK milk chocolate market. Between the two world wars Cadbury sent test packages to British schoolchildren in exchange for their opinions on new products, one of whom, Roald Dahl, would later write the children’s novel Charlie and the Chocolate Factory.

During the Second World War, parts of the Bournville factory were turned over to war work, producing milling machines and seats for fighter aircraft. Workers ploughed football fields to plant crops. As chocolate was regarded as an essential food, it was placed under government supervision for the entire war. The wartime rationing of chocolate ended in 1950, and normal production resumed. Cadbury subsequently invested in new factories and had an increasing demand for their products. In 1952 the Moreton factory was built.

Cadbury has been a holder of a Royal Warrant from Queen Elizabeth II since 1955. In 1967, Cadbury acquired an Australian confectioner, MacRobertson's, beating a rival bid from Mars. As a result of the takeover, Cadbury built a 60 percent market share in the Australian market.

Schweppes merger (1969) 

Cadbury merged with drinks company Schweppes to form Cadbury Schweppes in 1969. Head of Schweppes, Lord Watkinson, became chairman, and Adrian Cadbury became deputy chairman and managing director. The benefits of the merger were to prove elusive.

The merger put an end to Cadbury's close links to its Quaker founding family and its perceived social ethos by instilling a capitalist venturer philosophy in management.

In 1978, the company acquired Peter Paul, the third largest chocolate manufacturer in the United States for $58 million, which gave it a 10 percent share of the world's largest confectionery market. In 1979, Margaret Thatcher made an election campaign visit to the Bournville factory in the lead up to the 1979 United Kingdom general election. The highly successful Wispa chocolate bar was launched in the North East of England in 1981, and nationwide in 1984. In 1982, trading profits were greater outside of Britain than in the UK for the first time.

In 1986, Cadbury Schweppes sold its Beverages and Foods division to a management buyout known as Premier Brands for £97 million. This saw the company divest itself of such brands as Typhoo Tea, Kenco, Smash and Hartley Chivers jam. The deal also saw Premier take the licence for production of Cadbury brand biscuits and drinking chocolate.

Meanwhile, Schweppes switched its alliance in the UK from Pepsi to Coca-Cola, taking a 51 percent stake in the joint venture Coca-Cola Schweppes. The acquisition of Canada Dry doubled its worldwide drinks market share, and it took a 30 percent stake in Dr Pepper. As a result of these acquisitions, Cadbury Schweppes became the third largest soft drinks manufacturer in the world. In August 1988, the company sold its U.S. confectionery operations to Hershey's for $284.5 million cash plus the assumption of $30 million in debt.

In 1992, company chairman Sir Adrian Cadbury produced the Cadbury Report (via the Cadbury committee set up by the London Stock Exchange), a code of best practice which served as a basis for reform of corporate governance around the world. In 1999, Cadbury Schweppes sold its worldwide beverage businesses to The Coca-Cola Company except in North America and continental Europe for $700 million.

Snapple, Mistic and Stewart's (formerly Cable Car Beverage) were sold by Triarc to Cadbury Schweppes in 2000 for $1.45 billion. In October of that same year, Cadbury Schweppes purchased Royal Crown from Triarc. In 2003, Cadbury Schweppes acquired Adams, the US chewing gum operations of Pfizer Inc., for $4.2 billion, making Cadbury the world's biggest confectionery company. In 2005, Cadbury Schweppes acquired Green & Black's for £20 million.

Schweppes demerger 
In March 2007, it was revealed that Cadbury Schweppes was planning to split its business into two separate entities: one focusing on its main chocolate and confectionery market; the other on its US drinks business. The demerger took effect on 2 May 2008, with the drinks business becoming Dr Pepper Snapple Group and Cadbury Schweppes plc becoming Cadbury plc. In December 2008 it was announced that Cadbury was to sell its Australian beverage unit to Asahi Breweries.

2007–2010 

In October 2007, Cadbury announced the closure of the Somerdale Factory, in Keynsham, Somerset, formerly part of Fry's. Between 500 and 700 jobs were affected by this change. Production transferred to other plants in England and Poland.

In 2008, Monkhill Confectionery, the Own Label trading division of Cadbury Trebor Bassett was sold to Tangerine Confectionery for £58 million cash. This sale included factories at Pontefract, Cleckheaton and York and a distribution centre near Chesterfield, and the transfer of around 800 employees.

In mid-2009, Cadbury replaced some of the cocoa butter in their non-UK chocolate products with palm oil. Despite stating this was a response to consumer demand to improve taste and texture, there was no "new improved recipe" claim placed on New Zealand labels. Consumer backlash was significant from environmentalists and chocolate lovers in both Australia and New Zealand, with consumers objecting to both the taste from the cheaper formulation, and the use of palm oil given its role in the destruction of rainforests. By August 2009, the company announced that it was reverting to the use of cocoa butter in New Zealand and Australia, although palm oil is still listed as an ingredient in Cadbury's flavoured sugar syrup based fillings (where it referred to as 'vegetable oil'). In addition, Cadbury stated it would source cocoa beans through Fair Trade channels. In January 2010 prospective buyer Kraft pledged to honour Cadbury's commitment.

Acquisition and subsidiary (2009-) 

On 7 September 2009, Kraft Foods made a £10.2 billion (US$16.2 billion) indicative takeover bid for Cadbury. The offer was rejected, with Cadbury stating that it undervalued the company. Kraft launched a formal, hostile bid for Cadbury, valuing the firm at £9.8 billion on 9 November 2009. The UK Business Secretary Peter Mandelson warned Kraft not to try to "make a quick buck" from the acquisition of Cadbury.

On 19 January 2010, it was announced that Cadbury and Kraft Foods had reached a deal and that Kraft would purchase Cadbury for £8.40 per share, valuing Cadbury at £11.5bn (US$18.9bn). Kraft, which issued a statement stating that the deal will create a "global confectionery leader", had to borrow £7 billion (US$11.5bn) in order to finance the takeover.

The Hershey Company, based in Pennsylvania, manufactures and distributes Cadbury-branded chocolate (but not its other confectionery) in the United States and has been reported to share Cadbury's "ethos". Hershey had expressed an interest in buying Cadbury because it would broaden its access to faster-growing international markets. But on 22 January 2010, Hershey announced that it would not counter Kraft's final offer.

The acquisition of Cadbury faced widespread disapproval from the British public, as well as groups and organisations including trade union Unite, who fought against the acquisition of the company which, according to Prime Minister Gordon Brown, was very important to the British economy. Unite estimated that a takeover by Kraft could put 30,000 jobs "at risk", and UK shareholders protested over the mergers and acquisitions advisory fees charged by banks. Cadbury's M&A advisers were UBS, Goldman Sachs and Morgan Stanley. Controversially, RBS, a bank 84% owned by the United Kingdom Government, funded the Kraft takeover.

On 2 February 2010, Kraft secured over 71% of Cadbury's shares thus finalising the deal. Kraft had needed to reach 75% of the shares in order to be able to delist Cadbury from the stock market and fully integrate it as part of Kraft. This was achieved on 5 February, and the company announced that Cadbury shares would be de-listed on 8 March. On 3 February, the Chairman Roger Carr, chief executive Todd Stitzer and chief financial officer Andrew Bonfield all announced their resignations. Stitzer had worked at the company for 27 years. On 9 February, Kraft announced that it was planning to close the Somerdale Factory, Keynsham, with the loss of 400 jobs. The management explained that existing plans to move production to Poland were too advanced to be realistically reversed, though assurances had been given regarding sustaining the plant. Staff at Keynsham criticised this move, suggesting that they felt betrayed and as if they have been "sacked twice". On 22 April 2010, Phil Rumbol, the man behind the famous Cadbury Gorilla advertisement, announced his plans to leave the Cadbury company in July following Kraft's takeover.

The European Commission decided that Kraft would have to divest Cadbury's confectionery businesses in Poland (Wedel) and Romania (Kandia). In June 2010, the Polish division, Cadbury-Wedel, was sold to Lotte of Korea. As part of the deal Kraft kept the Cadbury, Hall's and other brands along with two plants in Skarbimierz. Lotte took over the plant in Warsaw along with the E Wedel brand. Kandia was sold back to the Meinl family, which had owned the brand from 2003 to 2007.

On 4 August 2011, Kraft Foods announced it would be splitting into two companies beginning on 1 October 2012. The confectionery business of Kraft became Mondelez International, of which Cadbury would become a subsidiary.

In response to diminishing margins in early 2014, Mondelez hired Accenture to implement a US$3 billion cost-cutting programme of the company's assets including Cadbury and Oreo. Beginning in 2015, Mondelez began closing Cadbury factories in several developed countries including Ireland, Canada, the United States, and New Zealand and shifting production to "advantaged" country locations like China, India, Brazil, and Mexico. The closure of Cadbury factories in centres such as Dublin, Montreal, Chicago, Philadelphia, and Dunedin in New Zealand generated outcries from the local populations. The plan received approval from several market shareholders including the Australian and New Zealand banks Westpac and ASB Bank.

In January 2017, Cadbury became the official snack partner of the Premier League, and sponsored the Premier League Golden Boot and Premier League Golden Glove awards.

Operations

Head office

Cadbury has its head office at Cadbury House in the Uxbridge Business Park in Uxbridge, Greater London, England.
The company occupies  of leased space inside Building 3 of the business park, which it shares with Mondelez's UK division. After acquiring Cadbury, Kraft confirmed that the company would remain at Cadbury House.

Cadbury relocated to Uxbridge Business Park from its previous head office at 25 Berkeley Square in Mayfair, City of Westminster in 2007 as a cost-saving measure. In 1992, the company leased the space for £55 per ; by 2002 this had reached £68.75 per square foot.

Production sites

Bournville

It subsequently became known as "the factory in a garden". Cadbury's dark chocolate bar, Bournville, is named after the model village, and was first sold in 1908.

Bournville employs almost 1,000 people. In 2014, Mondelez announced a £75 million investment in the site, with Cadbury stating it “reinforces Bournville's position at the heart of the British chocolate industry”.

Bournville is home to Mondelez's Global Centre of Excellence for Chocolate research and development, so every new chocolate product created by Cadbury starts life at the Birmingham plant.

Markets

United Kingdom 
The confectionery business in the UK is called Cadbury (formerly Cadbury Trebor Bassett) and, as of August 2004, had eight factories and 3,000 staff in the UK. Mondelez also sells biscuits bearing the Cadbury brand, such as Cadbury Fingers. Mondelez also owns Fry's and Maynards Bassetts (created by merging Bassett's with Maynards).

Ice cream based on Cadbury products, like 99 Flake, is made under licence by Frederick's Dairies. Cadbury cakes and chocolate spread are manufactured under licence by Premier Foods, but the cakes were originally part of Cadbury Foods Ltd with factories at Blackpole in Worcester and Moreton on the Wirral, with distribution depots throughout the UK.

Other Kraft subsidiaries in the UK include Cadbury Two LLP, Cadbury UK Holdings Limited, Cadbury US Holdings Limited, Cadbury Four LLP, Cadbury Holdings Limited, and Cadbury One LLP.

According to the environmental charity Keep Britain Tidy, Cadbury chocolate wrappers along with Walkers crisps packets and Coca-Cola cans were the three top brands that were the most common pieces of rubbish found in UK streets in 2013. In 2014, Cadbury Dairy Milk was ranked the best-selling chocolate bar in the UK. A 2018 YouGov poll saw Cadbury's Chocolate Digestives ranked the second most popular biscuit (cookie) in the UK after McVitie's Chocolate Digestives.

Ireland 

Cadbury Ireland Limited is based in Coolock in Dublin, where the headquarters of Cadbury Ireland are located, and Rathmore, County Kerry. Products made by Cadbury in Ireland include Cadbury Dairy Milk Range, Cadbury Twirl, Cadbury Cadbury Snacks Range Flake and Boost (formerly Moro). Cadbury used to produce the Time Out bar in Ireland for the European market however this production was moved to Poland.

United States 

Cadbury USA produces candy, gum, breath mints and cough drops. It is headquartered in Parsippany, New Jersey. The company was formed after the then Cadbury Schweppes purchased the Adams brand from Pfizer in December 2002 for US$4.2 billion.

American Chicle was purchased by Warner–Lambert in 1962; Warner-Lambert renamed the unit Adams in 1997 and merged with Pfizer in 2000.

In 1978, Cadbury merged with Peter Paul, makers of Mounds and Almond Joy. In 1988, The Hershey Company acquired the U.S. rights to its chocolate business. Accordingly, although the Cadbury group's chocolate products have been sold in the U.S. since 1988, they are manufactured by Hershey, causing complaints by consumers, who claim the Hershey-made products are inferior to the originals.  Before the May 2008 demerger, the North American business also contained beverage unit Cadbury Schweppes Americas Beverages. In 1982, Cadbury Schweppes purchased the Duffy-Mott Company.

Cadbury USA's products include:

Maynards

 Wine Gums (original and Sour)
 Swedish Fish
 Swedish Berries
 Juicy Squirts (Sours, Citrus, and Berry)
 Original Gummies
 Fuzzy Peach
 Sour Chillers
 Sour Patch Kids
 Mini Fruit Gums
 Sour Cherry Blasters
 Fruit Mania
 Bassett's Liquorice Allsorts

Chocolate-related

 Creme egg
 Caramello
 Royal Dark
 Dairy Milk

Gum

 Black Jack chewing gum
 Bubbaloo bubble gum
 Bubblicious bubble gum
 Chiclets
 Clorets
 Dentyne
 Freshen Up Gum
 Sour Cherry Gum (Limited)
 Sour Apple Gum (Limited)
 Stride
 Trident

Other
 Certs breath mints
 Halls (cough drop)
Discontinued products

 Beemans chewing gum
 Cinn*a*Burst gum
 Clove gum
 Fruit*a*Burst gum
 Mint*a*Burst gum
 Sparkies

Australia

Cadbury's products were first imported into Australia as early as 1853 when 3 cases of Cadbury's cocoa and chocolate were advertised for sale in Adelaide. Cadbury's first overseas order in 1881 was made for the Australian market. In 1919, as part of its plans to expand internationally, the company decided to build a factory in Australia. Tasmania was chosen as the location of Cadbury's first factory outside of the United Kingdom, due to its close proximity to the city of Hobart, good source of inexpensive hydro-electricity and plentiful supply of high-quality fresh milk. Cadbury's Claremont was modelled on Bournville, with its own village and sporting facilities.
The first products from Claremont were sold in 1922.
Cadbury's Claremont was once a popular tourist attraction and operated daily tours; however, the factory ceased running full tours mid-2008, citing health and safety reasons.
Cadbury has been upgrading its manufacturing facility at Claremont, Tasmania, Australia, since 2001.
Cadbury also operates a milk-processing plant in Cooee, Tasmania and two other factories in Melbourne, Victoria (Ringwood and Scoresby).

On 27 February 2009, the confectionery and beverages businesses of Cadbury Schweppes in Australia were formally separated and the beverages business began operating as Schweppes Australia Pty Ltd. In April 2009, Schweppes Australia was acquired by Asahi Breweries. In late June 2012, Cadbury introduced Marvellous Creations a new chocolate range with three flavours – Peanut Toffee Cookie, Jelly Crunchie Bits or Jelly Popping Candy Beanies covered in Dairy Milk Chocolate.

In 2015, the Australian Cadbury factory, located in Hobart, reduced its work force by 80 and in 2017 closed its visitor's centre. In August 2017, Cadbury announced that 50 workers will be shed from its Hobart factory. Within Australia there is debate regarding halal certification.  Many of Cadbury's products are halal certified. This certification has generated controversy, especially from One Nation politician Pauline Hanson.

New Zealand

Cadbury had also operated a factory in Dunedin in New Zealand's South Island until its closure in March 2018. In 1930, Cadbury partnered with local confectionery businessman Richard Hudson, who owned a chocolate, confectionery, biscuit factory on Castle Street. Hudson's factory was rebranded as Cadbury Hudson and later became known as the Cadbury Confectionery. Cadbury later established a second factory in Auckland in the North Island. In 2003, Cadbury established a tourist attraction on the premises of the Dunedin factory known as Cadbury World, which featured a large chocolate waterfall. In 2007, Cadbury closed down its Auckland factory, leading to the loss of 200 jobs. In 2009, the Cadbury Dunedin factory attracted criticism from consumers and local environmentalists when it replaced cocoa butter with palm oil. In response, the company backtracked but still retained palm oil as a filling in some ingredients. Over the next several years, Cadbury began downsizing its products, including trimming chocolate blocks in 2015.

On 16 February 2017, it was reported that Cadbury would be closing its factory in Dunedin, New Zealand by March 2018. This is estimated to lead to the loss of 350 jobs. Amanda Banfield, Mondelez's vice-president for Australia, New Zealand, and Japan, clarified that the closure was done due to Mondelez's decision to shift chocolate manufacturing to Cadbury's Australian factories. However, Mondelez has also confirmed that Dunedin's Cadbury World tourist attraction would remain open due to its popularity with tourists.

Following four weeks of consultations with local Cadbury employees, the Mayor of Dunedin Dave Cull, and local trade union representatives, Banfield confirmed that the closure would go ahead the following year due to the lack of viable options to continue production in New Zealand. She also confirmed that Cadbury would offer a redundancy support package to staff and would also sponsor staff willing to move to Australia to work. Mondelez also confirmed that it was looking for a third-party manufacturer to continue making Cadbury's New Zealand brands Pineapple Lumps, Jaffas, Chocolate Fish and Buzz Bar. In early June 2017, local city councillor Jim O'Malley and a group of volunteers launched a crowdfunding campaign to keep the Dunedin factory running on a portion of the site. They formed a group called Dunedin Manufacturing Holdings (DMH). Despite generating NZ$6 million in funds, DMH abandoned its bid on 22 June due to Mondelez's stringent production and supply requirements and difficulties in acquiring manpower and machinery. Mondelez has also indicated that it is negotiating with two local chocolate companies to ensure the production of iconic local brands such as Pineapple Lumps, Jaffas, Chocolate Fish, Buzz Bars, and Pinky Bars in New Zealand.

On 17 October 2017, Cadbury announced that it would be shifting all production of its New Zealand brands to Australia after failing to find a local supplier. The termination of New Zealand production took effect in March 2018. Mondelez's New Zealand country head James Kane confirmed the shift on the grounds that the production of Cadbury products would require certain technologies, production processes and skills that local New Zealand manufacturers lacked.

On 4 May, it was reported that the Dunedin Cadbury World would be closing down after the Ministry of Health purchased the entire former Cadbury factory site to make way for a new public hospital. Mondelez area vice-president Banfield confirmed that Cadbury had sold the former factory site to the Ministry of Health for an undisclosed amount.

Canada 

Cadbury's Canadian head office is located in Toronto. Cadbury Canada produce and import several products that are sold under the Cadbury and Maynards labels, including the following:

 Cadbury
 Cadbury Coconut
 Caramilk
 Creme Egg
 Crispy Crunch
 Crunchie
 Dairy Milk (various flavours)
 Flake
 Mini Eggs (also appear in a Tim Hortons doughnut)
 Mr. Big
 Pep
 Wunderbar (aka Starbar)

 Maynards
 Wine Gums
 Sour Wine Gums
 Swedish Berries
 Swedish Fish
 Sour Patch Kids
 Juicy Squirts

Cadbury Canada is now part of Mondelez Canada and products are featured on the Snackworks website.

India 

In 1948, Cadbury India began its operations in India by importing chocolates. On 19 July 1948, Cadbury was incorporated in India. It now has manufacturing facilities in Thane, Induri (Pune) and Malanpur (Gwalior), Hyderabad, Bangalore and Baddi (Himachal Pradesh) and sales offices in New Delhi, Mumbai, Kolkata and Chennai. The corporate head office is in Mumbai. The head office is presently situated at Pedder Road, Mumbai, under the name of "Cadbury House". This monumental structure at Pedder Road has been a landmark for the citizens of Mumbai since its creation.  Since 1965 Cadbury has also pioneered the development of cocoa cultivation in India. For over two decades, Cadbury has worked with the Kerala Agricultural University to undertake cocoa research.

Currently, Cadbury India operates in five categories – Chocolate confectionery, Beverages, Biscuits, Gum and Candy. Its products include Cadbury Dairy Milk, Dairy Milk Silk, Bournville, Temptations, Perk, Eclairs, Bournvita, Celebrations, Gems, Bubbaloo, Cadbury Dairy Milk Shots, Halls, Bilkul, Tang, and Oreo.

It is the market leader in the chocolate confectionery business with a market share of over 70%. On 21 April 2014, Cadbury India changed its name to Mondelez India Foods Limited. In 2017, Cadbury/Mondelez agreed to pay a $13 million FCPA penalty for making illicit payments to government officials to obtain licences and approvals to build a factory in Baddi.

As part of Cadbury's efforts to innovate and its focus on experiential marketing, Cadbury recently opened "The Purple Room". The room is located at the newly inaugurated Jio World Drive (JWD) Mall in Bandra Kurla Complex, Mumbai, inside the superstore – Freshpik. It is home the world's first customer facing 3D Cadbury chocolate printer and aims to offer a premium chocolate experience. The store offers 28 chocolate designs in 3D, including all alphabets for a personalised and unique experience, available for a limited time.

Issues 
In 2003, Businessworld in India reported there were ‘Insects found in Cadbury’s chocolates’. In 2021, Central Bureau of Investigation (CBI) carried out raids in Haryana and Himachal on Cadbury India Ltd premises. CBI filed FIR against Cadbury for corruption in connection with obtaining Himachal factory licence. CBI said Cadbury allegedly conspired with central excise officials between 2009 and 2011 and availed excise benefits to the tune of Rs 241 crore for its new unit in Himachal Pradesh.

Malta 

In 2012, Alf Mizzi & Sons Marketing (Ltd) took over the importation and distribution of Cadbury, as well as several other Mondelez brands. Most of the Cadbury products are imported directly from the UK. The advertising of the brand was taken over by Sloane Ltd., which proved to be highly successful in creating market specific commercials, reaching more of the Maltese population than ever through digital advertising.

South Africa 
Cadbury was introduced to South Africa in 1903 by the Cadbury brothers, Richard and George. The brothers appointed a sales agent to sell their products to the locals. The brand's popularity grew such that in 1926, the South African arm of Cadbury was formed and plans were made to construct a local chocolate manufacturing plant.

Cadbury broke ground with a chocolate plant in Port Elizabeth in 1930. By 1938, the first locally produced moulded Cadbury Dairy Milk chocolate slabs were produced. The first slabs of chocolate produced were the Milk, Nut Milk, Milk Fruit, Nut Brazil, Fruit & Nut and Bournville variety of Cadbury products.

In the 1950s, the Port Elizabeth factory was expanded to include a new laboratory in order to start producing new products, such as the Flake and Crunchie Bar (1960s). By the 1970s, the factory was expanded again to add a new Raw Materials Store and crumb silos. These have since become a local landmark. The same factory still produces some of the supply of Cadbury chocolate in South Africa.

In 2011, Kraft Foods, the company that then owned Cadbury, announced that it would be launching a fair-trade Dairy Milk chocolate bar on the South African market. The product had been available in other countries where Cadbury operated since 2009. The South African operation of Cadbury has a completely Africa-based supply chain, with cocoa beans bought in Ghana and the chocolate bars made in the factory at Port Elizabeth.

Advertising

The Cadbury script logo is derived from the signature of William Cadbury, the founder's grandson, in 1921. It was adopted as the worldwide logo in the 1970s. Cadbury famously trademarked the colour purple for chocolates with registrations in 1995 and 2004. However, the validity of these trademarks is the matter of an ongoing legal dispute following objections by Nestlé.

The brand has used immersive experiential marketing campaigns which include a Double Decker fun bus, Joy Generator machine and pop-up cafes. Cadbury has had famous names on their products, which includes a Paddington Bear branded chocolate bar in 1977, and Spice Girls-branded chocolate (individual chocolate bars, selection boxes, Easter Eggs) at the height of their 1990s success.

The 2007 Gorilla commercial promoting Cadbury Dairy Milk – featuring Phil Collins "In the Air Tonight" – won numerous awards, including Gold at the British Television Advertising Awards in 2008. Four commercials for Cadbury products featured in the top 50 of Channel 4’s 2000 UK poll of the "100 Greatest Adverts".  Cadbury Flake, featuring Flake Girl, was ranked 26th, Cadbury Dairy Milk Fruit & Nut, featuring the slogan 'Everyone's a fruit and nutcase' sung by comedian Frank Muir, ranked 36th, Fry's Turkish Delight, with the slogan 'Full of Eastern Promise' accompanied with model Jane Lumb, ranked 37th, and Cadbury Milk Tray (which since 1968 has been advertised by the 'Milk Tray Man', a tough James Bond–style figure who undertakes daunting 'raids' to secretively deliver a box of Milk Tray chocolates to a lady), the "Avalanche" advert where he races ahead of it to deliver the chocolates, ranked 48th.

Every year Cadbury also launches a Secret Santa campaign which features offline and online advertisements. The brand also tours the UK's major cities encouraging people to anonymously give their loved ones a free chocolate bar. Cadbury has specifically designed booths for the occasion but in 2020 due to the COVID-19 pandemic the campaign was done virtually.

Products 

 

Major chocolate brands produced by Cadbury include the bars Dairy Milk, Crunchie, Double Decker, Caramel, Wispa, Boost, Picnic, Flake, Curly Wurly, Chomp, and Fudge; chocolate Buttons; the boxed chocolate brand Milk Tray; and the twist-wrapped chocolates Heroes which are most popular around holidays, such as Christmas and Halloween (Cadbury Goo Heads (similar to Creme Eggs) are released for Halloween). Selection boxes (containing a selection of Cadbury bars and sweets) is a staple Christmas gift of chocolate, a tradition that in Britain goes back over a century (as are Cadbury Roses since the late 1930s).

Creme Eggs are only sold between New Year's Day and Easter. Tony Bilborough from Cadbury told BBC Radio 5 Live: "There's something special about Creme Egg season. We long for it in those long, eggless days of summer and autumn."

As well as Cadbury's chocolate, the company also owns Maynards and Halls, and is associated with several types of confectionery including former Trebor and Bassett's brands or products such as Liquorice Allsorts, Jelly Babies, Flumps, Mints, Black Jack chews, Trident gum, and Softmints. Global sales of Cadbury products amounted to  £491 million in the 52 weeks to 16 August 2014.

Notable product introductions include:

Incidents

2006 salmonella scare 
On 20 January 2006, Cadbury Schweppes detected a strain of the Salmonella Montevideo (SmvdX07) bacteria, affecting seven of its products. The contamination was caused by a leaking pipe, from which waste water dripped onto a chocolate crumb production line at the company's plant in Marlbrook, Herefordshire. It was not until around six months after the leak was detected that Cadbury Schweppes notified the Food Standards Agency, a delay which Cadbury Schweppes was unable to explain satisfactorily, and for which it was criticised. The Food Standards Agency ordered the company to recall more than a million chocolate bars. In December 2006, the company announced that the cost of dealing with the incident reached £30 million.

In April 2007, Birmingham City Council announced that it would be prosecuting Cadbury Schweppes in relation to three alleged offences of breaching food safety legislation. At that time, the Health Protection Agency identified 37 people who had been infected with Salmonella Montevideo. One of the alleged victims had to be kept on a hospital isolation ward for five days after eating a Cadbury's caramel bar. An investigation that was carried by Herefordshire Council led to a further six charges being brought. The company pleaded guilty to all nine charges, and was fined one million pounds at Birmingham Crown Court — the sentencing of both cases was brought together. Analysts have said the fine is not material to the group, with mitigating factors limiting the fine being that the company quickly admitted its guilt and said it had been mistaken that the infection did not pose a threat to health.

2007 recalls 
On 10 February 2007, Cadbury recalled some of its Easter eggs due to a labelling error. The products were produced in a factory handling nuts, potential allergens, but this was not made clear on the packaging. Cadbury said the products were "perfectly safe" for people without nut allergies to eat.

On 14 September 2007, Cadbury Schweppes investigated a manufacturing error over allergy warning, recalling for the second time in two years thousands of chocolate bars. A printing mistake at Somerdale Factory resulted in the omission of tree nut allergy labels from 250g Dairy Milk Double Chocolate bars.

2008 melamine contamination in China
On 29 September 2008, Cadbury withdrew all of its 11 chocolate products made in its three Beijing factories, on suspicion of contamination with melamine. The recall affected the mainland China markets, Taiwan, Hong Kong and Australia. Products recalled included Dark Chocolate, a number of products in the 'Dairy Milk' range and Chocolate Eclairs.

2014 pork traces in Malaysia 
Cadbury recalled two chocolate products after it was tested positive for traces of pork DNA, namely Cadbury Dairy Milk Hazelnut and Cadbury Dairy Milk Roast Almond. The traces were found during a periodic check for non-halal ingredients in food products by the Ministry of Health in Malaysia which on 24 May 2014 said two of three samples of the company's products may contain pork traces.

On 2 June 2014, Malaysia's Department of Islamic Development (JAKIM) declared that the sample did not contain pig DNA, as claimed in earlier reports. This statement was made after new tests were conducted.

JAKIM reportedly said in a statement that it tested 11 samples of Cadbury Dairy Milk Hazelnut, Cadbury Dairy Milk Roast Almond and other products from the company's factory but none of them tested positive for pork. The investigation followed reports that unscheduled checks had shown that two chocolates produced by Mondelez International Inc., the parent company of Cadbury, violated Islamic law and led to a boycott of all its products in the country.

2017 "Easter" controversy 

In 2017, the Church of England condemned the company and the National Trust for rebranding their annual "Easter Egg Trails" as "Cadbury Egg Hunts". Prime Minister Theresa May called the rebranding "absolutely ridiculous"; however,  Cadbury dismissed the criticism, with a spokesperson saying, "it is clear to see that within our communications we visibly state the word Easter. It is included a number of times across promotional materials." An ensuing controversy followed in Australia, where Cadbury was accused of removing the word 'Easter' from the packaging of its Easter eggs. Cadbury Australia responded that Easter was mentioned on "the back of pack", and that its eggs were obviously Easter eggs.

2019 "Cadbury Treasures" campaign 
In the run-up to Easter 2019, Cadbury launched a "Treasures" promotion in the UK and Ireland that, as well as listing treasure exhibits in various museums, unintentionally encouraged people to engage in illegal metal-detecting and digging at protected archaeological sites around the British Isles in search of further treasure. This prompted a highly critical reaction from archaeologists.

2022 Channel 4 Dispatches Child Labour Claims

In 2022, Cadbury Exposed: Dispatches aired on Channel 4 revealed child labour in cocoa farming for Cadbury chocolate. Mondelez International initially refused to comment before releasing a statement after the programme had aired. Mr Barnett claimed Mondelez CEO Dirk Van de Put had "refused to be interviewed" but the company "did not dispute our findings (and were) deeply concerned by the incidents documented by Dispatches and would launch an investigation."

See also 

 Cadbury World
 Cadbury family
 Cadbury Athletic F.C.
 Kryoryctes cadburyi

References

Further reading

External links 

 

 
Mondelez International
Confectionery companies of the United Kingdom
British brands
British chocolate companies
Mondelez International brands
Food and drink companies established in 1824
Companies formerly listed on the London Stock Exchange
Food manufacturers of England
Companies based in Buckinghamshire
British Royal Warrant holders
1824 establishments in England
British companies established in 1824
2010 mergers and acquisitions
Denham, Buckinghamshire
British subsidiaries of foreign companies
Food brands of the United Kingdom